Conjure and Command is a fourth studio album released by American thrash metal band Toxic Holocaust, released on July 19, 2011. This is the first release featuring a full band in the studio instead of Joel Grind performing all instruments and vocals himself.

Track listing

All songs written by Joel Grind.

Personnel
Toxic Holocaust
 Joel Grind – lead vocals, guitars
 Phil Zeller – bass, backing vocals
 Nick Bellmore – drums

Additional musician
 Tim Smith – backing vocals

Production
 Daniel "Sawblade" Shaw – cover art
 Joel Grind – layout, design
 Dave Schiff – layout, design
 Dan Randall – mastering

References

External links

2011 albums
Toxic Holocaust albums
Relapse Records albums